The Sevona Cabin is located on Sand Island of the Apostle Islands National Lakeshore.

History
Also known as the Sevona Memorial Cottage, the cabin was built in part with salvaged wreckage of the Sevona in 1905. It was constructed by former Lieutenant Governor of Wisconsin Sam Fifield. The cabin was added to the National Register of Historic Places in 1976 and to the Wisconsin State Register of Historic Places in 1989.

References

Houses on the National Register of Historic Places in Wisconsin
National Register of Historic Places in Bayfield County, Wisconsin
Houses in Bayfield County, Wisconsin
National Register of Historic Places in Apostle Islands National Lakeshore
Vernacular architecture in Wisconsin
Houses completed in 1905
1905 establishments in Wisconsin